Year 168 (CLXVIII) was a leap year starting on Thursday (link will display the full calendar) of the Julian calendar. At the time, it was known as the Year of the Consulship of Apronianus and Paullus (or, less frequently, year 921 Ab urbe condita). The denomination 168 for this year has been used since the early medieval period, when the Anno Domini calendar era became the prevalent method in Europe for naming years.

Events 
 By place 
 Roman Empire 
 Emperor Marcus Aurelius and his adopted brother Lucius Verus leave Rome, and establish their headquarters at Aquileia. 
 The Roman army crosses the Alps into Pannonia, and subdues the Marcomanni at Carnuntum, north of the Danube.

 Asia 
 Emperor Ling of Han succeeds Emperor Huan of Han as the emperor of the Chinese Han Dynasty; the first year of the Jianning era.

Births 
 Cao Ren, Chinese general (d. 223)
 Gu Yong, Chinese chancellor (d. 243)
 Li Tong, Chinese general (d. 209)

Deaths 
 Anicetus, pope of Rome (approximate date)
 Chen Fan, Chinese official and politician
 Daniel of Padua, Italian bishop and saint
 Dou Wu, Chinese politician and regent
 Huan of Han, Chinese emperor (b. 132)
 Titus Flavius Boethus, Roman politician
 Titus Furius Victorinus, Roman prefect

References 

 

als:160er#168